The meatball sandwich is a common sandwich that is a part of several cuisines, including Italian-American cuisine and American cuisine.

Overview
The sandwich primarily consists of meatballs, a tomato sauce or marinara sauce, and bread, such as Italian bread, baguette and bread rolls. Cheese such as provolone and mozzarella is sometimes used as an ingredient. Additional ingredients can include garlic, green pepper and butter, among others. It is sometimes prepared in the form of a submarine sandwich.

History
It has been suggested that the meatball sandwich was invented in the United States around the time of the turn of the 20th century.

Gallery

See also

 Italian beef sandwich
 Italian sandwich
 List of meatball dishes
 List of sandwiches
 Spaghetti and meatballs

References

External links
 

Meatballs
Italian-American cuisine
American sandwiches
Hot sandwiches